North Greenwich may refer to:
Current uses
Greenwich Peninsula, also known as "North Greenwich" (this should not be confused with North Greenwich, Isle of Dogs)
North Greenwich tube station
The O2 (Arena), also (rarely and in most formal usage) known as the North Greenwich Arena
North Greenwich bus station
North Greenwich Pier
North Greenwich, Isle of Dogs, London a 19th-century name for an locality  of the Isle of Dogs
Defunct meaning
North Greenwich railway station, a disused station that served the above area
North Greenwich (football ground), a now defunct stadium that was occupied by Millwall Athletic F.C. between 1901–1910